A ladies' man or lady's man is a man who enjoys spending time socially with women, who strives to please them and that women find attractive. 

Ladies' man or lady's man may also refer to:

Literature
 Ladies' Man (novel), a 1978 novel by Richard Price

Film
 Ladies' Man (1931 film), starring William Powell
 Ladies' Man (1947 film), an American film starring Eddie Bracken
 The Ladies Man, a 1961 Jerry Lewis film
 The Ladies Man (2000 film), a film about the Saturday Night Live character
 Ladies' Man: A MADE Movie, a 2013 MTV movie starring Dave Randolph-Mayhem Davis

Television
 Ladies' Man (1980 TV series), an American sitcom starring Lawrence Pressman
 Ladies Man (1999 TV series), a 1999 television sitcom starring Alfred Molina

Episodes
 Leon Phelps, The Ladies' Man, a Saturday Night Live character played by Tim Meadows
 "Lady's Man" (Law & Order: Criminal Intent), a 2009 episode of Criminal Intent
 "Ladies Man", episode 37 of the Nickelodeon TV show All Grown Up!

Music
 Ladies Man, an alternative title for Science Fiction, an unauthorized live album by Alice Cooper
 Ladies Man (album), a 2001 album by Teddy Edwards
 "Ladies Man" (song), a 2000 single by New Zealand rock band The D4
 "Ladies' Man", a 1982 song by Joni Mitchell from her album Wild Things Run Fast

See also
 Promiscuity, the practice of having casual sex frequently with different partners or being indiscriminate in the choice of sexual partners
 Lothario, a male given name that came to suggest an unscrupulous seducer of women in The Impertinent Curious Man, a metastory in Don Quixote
Łady-Mans